Marsdenia lloydii, the corky marsdenia, is a climbing plant found in eastern Australia. This member of the Dogbane family exudes white sap when leaves are broken from the stem. The stems have a white fissured corky covering. This plant is found in and around drier rainforest areas, north from Gloucester, New South Wales.

References

Marsdenia
Flora of New South Wales
Flora of Queensland
Taxa named by Paul Irwin Forster